Shaoyang University (sometimes abbreviated as SYU) is a university located in Shaoyang, Hunan, in south central China.

As of fall 2013, the university has 3 campuses, a combined student body of 17,112 students, 776 faculty members, 330 staff members, and over 60,000 living alumni. The university consists of 14 departments, with 45 specialties for undergraduates, 2 specialties for master's degree candidates.

At present, the university has 23 research institutions and research centres, including 1 provincial  engineering research centre.

As of 2022, the Best Chinese Universities Ranking, one of sub-ranks to the "Shanghai Ranking", ranked Shaoyang University 506th out of around 3,000 universities and colleges in China.

History
Shaoyang University was formed in 1958.

Academics
 Department of Economic Administration
 Department of Politic and Low
 Department of Physical
 Department of Chinese Language and Literature
 Department of Foreign Languages
 Department of Music
 Department of Artistic Designing
 Department of Science and Information Science
 Department of Biological and Chemical Engineering
 Department of Architecture and Urban Planning
 Department of Machinery and Energy Engineering
 Department of Electric Engineering
 Department of Information Engineering
 Department of Accounting

Library collections
Shaoyang University's total collection reaches to more than 1.51 million items.

Culture
 Motto:

People

Notable faculty
 Li Guojie, a member of the Chinese Academy of Engineering.
 Jiang Dawei, honorary professor.
 Justin Hill, English author, taught here from 1998-9 and 2005-6 , when he received the 2005 Xiaoxiang Friendship Award from the Governor of Hunan. His prize-winning novel, The Drink and Dream Teahouse, was set in Shaoyang.

References

External links
 

Universities and colleges in Hunan
Educational institutions established in 1958
Education in Shaoyang
1958 establishments in China